Demmler is a surname. Notable people with the surname include:

Georg Adolph Demmler (1804–1886), German architect and politician
Kurt Demmler (1943–2009), German songwriter, accused of sexual abuse he hanged himself in his Berlin jail cell. 
Ralph H. Demmler (1904–1995), American lawyer 
Steven E. Demmler Sr. (1952-), Chief Props at Saturday Night Live for more than 46 seasons.